Demetris Moulazimis (born 15 January 1992) is a Cypriot right back football player who plays for Enosis Neon Paralimni

Career
He has been raised through the academies of Fiorentina. He played also in Cyprus U-21 national team.

References

External links

https://web.archive.org/web/20140702185935/http://www.omonoia.com.cy/?lang=GR&tab=football&section=omonoiateam
http://www.omonoia.com.cy/?tab=football&section=news&nid=1361

1992 births
Living people
Cypriot footballers
AC Omonia players
Ermis Aradippou FC players
Enosis Neon Paralimni FC players
Ethnikos Achna FC players
Cypriot expatriate footballers
Association football midfielders
Greek Cypriot people
People from Paralimni